Quercetin is a plant flavonol from the flavonoid group of polyphenols. It is found in many fruits, vegetables, leaves, seeds, and grains; capers, red onions, and kale are common foods containing appreciable amounts of it. It has a bitter flavor and is used as an ingredient in dietary supplements, beverages, and foods.

Occurrence 
Quercetin is a flavonoid widely distributed in nature. The name has been used since 1857, and is derived from quercetum (oak forest), after the oak genus Quercus. It is a naturally occurring polar auxin transport inhibitor.

Quercetin is one of the most abundant dietary flavonoids, with an average daily consumption of 25–50 milligrams.

In red onions, higher concentrations of quercetin occur in the outermost rings and in the part closest to the root, the latter being the part of the plant with the highest concentration. One study found that organically grown tomatoes had 79% more quercetin than non-organically grown fruit. Quercetin is present in various kinds of honey from different plant sources.

Biosynthesis 

In plants, phenylalanine is converted to 4-coumaroyl-CoA in a series of steps known as the general phenylpropanoid pathway using phenylalanine ammonia-lyase, cinnamate-4-hydroxylase, and 4-coumaroyl-CoA-ligase. One molecule of 4-coumaroyl-CoA is added to three molecules of malonyl-CoA to form tetrahydroxychalcone using 7,2′-dihydroxy-4′-methoxyisoflavanol synthase. Tetrahydroxychalcone is then converted into naringenin using chalcone isomerase.

Naringenin is converted into eriodictyol using flavanoid 3′-hydroxylase. Eriodictyol is then converted into dihydroquercetin with flavanone 3-hydroxylase, which is then converted into quercetin using flavonol synthase.

Glycosides 

Quercetin is the aglycone form of a number of other flavonoid glycosides, such as rutin (also known as quercetin-3-O-rutinoside) and quercitrin, found in citrus fruit, buckwheat and onions. Quercetin forms the glycosides quercitrin and rutin together with rhamnose and rutinose, respectively. Likewise guaijaverin is the 3-O-arabinoside, hyperoside is the 3-O-galactoside, isoquercitin is the 3-O-glucoside and spiraeoside is the 4′-O-glucoside. CTN-986 is a quercetin derivative found in cottonseeds and cottonseed oil. Miquelianin is the quercetin 3-O-β-D-glucuronopyranoside.

A number of taxifolin (also known as dihydroquercetin) glycosides also exists.

Isoquercetin is the 3-O-glucoside of quercetin.

Rutin degradation pathway 

The enzyme quercitrinase can be found in Aspergillus flavus. This enzyme hydrolyzes the glycoside quercitrin to release quercetin and L-rhamnose. It is an enzyme in the rutin catabolic pathway.

Pharmacology

Pharmacokinetics 
The bioavailability of quercetin in humans after oral intake is very low, with one study concluding it must be less than 1%. Intravenous injection of quercetin shows a rapid decay in concentration described by a two-compartment model (initial half-life of 8.8 minutes, terminal half-life of 2.4 hours). Because it undergoes rapid and extensive metabolism, the biological effects presumed from in vitro studies are unlikely to apply in vivo. Quercetin supplements in the aglycone form are less bioavailable than the quercetin glycoside often found in foods, especially red onions. Ingestion with high-fat foods may increase bioavailability compared to ingestion with low-fat foods, and carbohydrate-rich foods may increase absorption of quercetin by stimulating gastrointestinal motility and colonic fermentation.

Metabolism 
Quercetin is rapidly metabolized (via glucuronidation) after the ingestion of quercetin foods or supplements. Five metabolites (quercetin glucuronides) have been found in human plasma after quercetin ingestion. Taken together, the quercetin glucuronides have a half life around 11-12 hours.

In rats, quercetin did not undergo any significant phase I metabolism. In contrast, quercetin did undergo extensive phase II (conjugation) to produce metabolites that are more polar than the parent substance and hence are more rapidly excreted from the body. In vitro, the meta-hydroxyl group of catechol is methylated by catechol-O-methyltransferase. Four of the five hydroxyl groups of quercetin are glucuronidated by UDP-glucuronosyltransferase. The exception is the 5-hydroxyl group of the flavonoid ring which generally does not undergo glucuronidation. The major metabolites of orally absorbed quercetin are quercetin-3-glucuronide, 3'-methylquercetin-3-glucuronide, and quercetin-3'-sulfate. A methyl metabolite of quercetin has been shown in vitro to be more effective than quercetin at inhibiting lipopolysaccharide-activated macrophages.

Compared to other flavonoids quercetin is one of the most effective inducers of the phase II detoxification enzymes.

In-vitro studies show that quercetin is a strong inhibitor of the cytochrome P450 enzymes CYP3A4 and CYP2C19 and a moderate inhibitor of CYP2D6. Drugs that are metabolized by these pathways may have increased effect. An in-vivo study found that quercetin supplementation slows the metabolism of caffeine to a statistically significant extent in a particular genetic sub-population, but in absolute terms the effect was almost negligible.

Pharmacological research 

Quercetin has been reported to inhibit the oxidation of other molecules and hence is classified as an antioxidant in vitro.  It contains a polyphenolic chemical substructure that stops oxidation in vitro by acting as a scavenger of free radicals. Quercetin has been shown to inhibit the PI3K/AKT pathway leading to downregulation of the anti-apoptotic protein Bcl-w. Quercetin activates or inhibits the activities of a number of proteins in vitro. For example, it is a nonspecific protein kinase enzyme inhibitor.

Food safety
In 2010, the FDA acknowledged high-purity quercetin as GRAS for use as an ingredient in various specified food categories at levels up to 500 milligrams per serving.

Health claims 
Quercetin has been studied in basic research and small clinical trials. While supplements have been promoted for the treatment of cancer and various other diseases, there is no high-quality evidence that quercetin (via supplements or in food) is useful to treat cancer or any other disease.

The US Food and Drug Administration has issued warning letters to several manufacturers advertising on their product labels and websites that quercetin product(s) can be used to treat diseases. The FDA regards such quercetin advertising and products as unapproved – with unauthorized health claims concerning the anti-disease products – as defined by "sections 201(g)(1)(B) and/or 201 (g)(1)(C) of the Act [21 U.S.C. § 321(g)(1)(B) and/or 21 U.S.C. § 321(g)(1)(C)] because they are intended for use in the diagnosis, cure, mitigation, treatment, or prevention of disease", conditions not met by the manufacturers.

Safety
There has been little research into the safety of quercetin supplementation in humans, and the results are insufficient to give confidence that the practice is safe. In particular, there is a lack of safety information on the effect of quercetin supplementation for pregnant women, breastfeeding women, children, and adolescents. The hormonal effects of quercetin found in animal studies raise the suspicion of a parallel effect in humans, particularly in respect of estrogen-dependent tumors.

Quercetin supplementation can interfere with the effects of medications. The precise nature of this interaction is known for some common medicines, but for many, it is not.

See also 

 List of ineffective cancer treatments
 Flavonol 3-sulfotransferase
 Phenolic compounds in wine
 Phytochemical
 Quercetin 2,3-dioxygenase
 Quercetin 3-O-methyltransferase
 Quercetin-3-sulfate 3'-sulfotransferase
 Quercetin-3-sulfate 4'-sulfotransferase
 Quercetin-3,3'-bissulfate 7-sulfotransferase

References

External links

 
Aromatase inhibitors
CYP2C8 inhibitors
CYP3A4 inhibitors
Flavonoid antioxidants
GPER agonists
Xanthine oxidase inhibitors
Experimental medical treatments
Phytoestrogens
Selective ERβ agonists